D423 is a state road in Slavonia region of Croatia, connecting the Port of Slavonski Brod to the city of Slavonski Brod and the A3 motorway Slavonski Brod istok (east) interchange via D514 state road.

As the road passes through an urban zone, it comprises a substantial number of street intersections, some of which are regulated by traffic lights.

The road, as well as all other state roads in Croatia, is managed and maintained by Hrvatske Ceste, state owned company.

Road junctions and populated areas

Sources

State roads in Croatia
Brod-Posavina County